Sanders Chocolates was an American chocolate company established by Fred Sanders on June 17, 1875. According to company history, by the mid-20th century, the company operated 57 retail stores in the Great Lakes Region, featuring counter service offering candy, fudge toppings, baked goods, light lunches and an assortment of desserts. Sanders is known for Bumpy cake, and hot fudge cream puffs.

History

The company was founded by a German-born Frederick Sanders Schmidt on June 17, 1875, when he opened a candy store on Woodward Avenue at Gratiot in downtown Detroit. Schmidt, who went by his middle name, chose Sanders as the name of his company.  The first Sanders shop was opened in Chicago but relocated to Detroit after the Chicago store was destroyed in the Great Fire of 1871. Ice cream was soon added to the menu, followed by baked goods and sweet cream sodas.  The ""Pavilion of Sweets,” Sanders’ most famed confectionery shop, opened on the corner of Michigan and Woodward Avenues in 1891, featuring a red and white awning and a tower featuring a cupola reminiscent of Moorish architecture. The store later moved to another location on Woodward into a former J. L. Hudson store, and named the "Palace of Sweets."  

Although Sanders is not the only man claimed to have invented the ice cream soda, a popular story is that when finding that his cream had gone sour, he substituted ice cream in a cream soda. Sanders hot fudge, based on a family recipe, become one of Sanders’ most famous products. Sanders’ is also known for its Bumpy Cake,” named for the chocolate ganache covering thick ridges of Buttercream. As Sanders grew, it quickly became the dominant candy company in Detroit. Sanders grew to operated chain of stand-alone neighborhood candy stores, some featuring counters that also served light lunches and soda fountain drinks.

The company produced their candy and other products at a factory in Highland Park, Michigan from 1941 to 1994, employing 300 at its peak. Originally, the factory sourced fresh milk for their confectionary treats from the adjacent "Cow Palace," until prevented by a change in city ordinances. In 1994, the company was forced to sell the factory because the ceilings provided insufficient clearance for newer equipment. The former factory succumbed to fire in 2012.

By 1962, when John Sanders, great-grandson of the founder, took over company operations, more than $20 million a year in sales. At that time, Sanders had 111 stores and was also sold in malls, grocery stores and had nation-wide distribution.Needs citation

Many artifacts from Sanders' history are exhibited in the Detroit Historical Museum.

Innovations 
Sanders was one of the first businesses in Detroit to be open on Sunday. Although profitable, Fred Sanders eventually bowed to pressure and close on Sundays. The Detroit Historical Society recognizes Sanders for innovations including

 operating the first carry-out service
 moving from high counters to what is now the more common lower table-height type of seating
 using dry ice to keep ice cream cold

Sanders was among the first in Detroit to operate equipment run by electric motors, new technology prone to frequent breakdowns. Henry Ford, a young mechanic who at the time worked at Edison Illuminating Company, was often hired to repair the motors.

Bankruptcy and Subsequent Acquisitions 
During the 1970s and 1980s the firm struggled financially as Sanders faced increased competition. Eventually, the company was forced to close its flagship downtown store. In 1979, Stephen A. Horn took over operations in mid-1979, as only the second president outside of the Sanders family.

The company was in danger of going broke due to protracted recession in Detroit and Michigan, coupled with increased costs for sugar and chocolate. In 1981, the Sanders company filed for reorganization under Chapter 11 of the Federal Bankruptcy Act in order to protect it from legal action by 734 creditors who were owed $4 million in unsecured debt. At that time, the company employed 1200 people at its 50 retail outlets and at its factory. On May 4, 1988, the US Court of Appeals for the Sixth Circuit approved a plan offered by FSI's employees' union, United Distributive Workers Council 30, for the purchase of FSI's assets by Country Home Bakery, Inc.

In 2002 Morley Candy Makers, another Michigan-based confectioner, purchased the Sanders name and original recipes, adding to its own product line. In 2004 sale of Country Home, which no longer included Sanders, was purchased by J&J Snack Foods.Needs citation

In 2018, Sanders became a division of Kar's Nuts when it acquired Morley and Sanders. In 2021, Kar's  and Sanders were united under the corporate name Second Nature Brands, acquired in 2022 by UK-based private equity company, CapVest Limited

Legacy 
By 2014, the number of Sanders shops in metro Detroit had been reduced to nine; however, two additional retail outlets operated on Mackinac Island, Michigan. By 2016, the Sanders had become a growing nationally presence as popular desserts and candy brand.”

2020's COVID-19 pandemic in the United States, forced the company to close all but three of its few remaining retail locations in metro Detroit. After rethinking its  business model and noting strong local and nationwide demand for its products online, the company announced that it was accelerating the development of a new retail strategy, including introduction of home delivery services.

References

Sources

website
  Of soda fountains and ice cream parlors  February 11, 1996 Detroit News
  Sanders Candy website

Companies based in Detroit
Ice cream parlors in the United States
Culture of Detroit
Retail companies established in 1875
Confectionery companies of the United States
Companies based in Metro Detroit
American chocolate companies